The 2014 United States House of Representatives elections in Wisconsin were held on Tuesday, November 4, 2014, to elect the eight U.S. representatives from the state of Wisconsin, one from each of the state's eight congressional districts. The elections coincided with the elections of other federal and state offices, including an election for Governor of Wisconsin.

Overview
Results of the 2014 United States House of Representatives elections in Wisconsin by district:

District 1

In 2012, Republican incumbent Paul Ryan defeated Democrat Rob Zerban, a former member of the Kenosha County Board and entrepreneur; 2012 was the closest election of Ryan's congressional career. Zerban is running again in 2014. Amar Kaleka, a documentary film maker and the son of a victim of the 2012 Wisconsin Sikh temple shooting, also ran for the Democratic nomination, but lost in the primary.

Primary results

General election

Results

District 2

Democratic incumbent Mark Pocan has represented the district since 2013. This district has a PVI of D+17.

Mathematics professor Peter Theron is the Republican nominee.

Primary results

General election

Results

District 3

Democratic incumbent Ron Kind has represented the district since 1996. He was re-elected with 64% of the vote in 2012 and the district has a PVI of D+5.

Businessman and veteran Tony Kurtz is the Republican nominee.

Primary results

General election

Results

District 4

Democratic incumbent Gwen Moore has represented the district since 2005. She was re-elected with 72% of the vote in 2012 and the district has a PVI of D+23.

Former State Senator and convicted felon Gary George ran against her in the Democratic primary., losing by a substantial margin.

Primary results

General election

Results

District 5

Republican incumbent Jim Sensenbrenner has represented the district since 1978. He was re-elected with 67.72% of the vote in 2012 and the district has a PVI of R+13.

Chris Rockwood, an electrical engineer who previously ran as a Democratic candidate for the Wisconsin State Assembly, is the Democratic nominee.

Primary results

General election

Results

District 6

The sixth district is represented by Republican Tom Petri, who is retiring.

For the Republicans, State Senator Glenn Grothman, State Representative Duey Stroebel and State Senator Joe Leibham sought the nomination. Wisconsin State Senate Majority Leader Scott L. Fitzgerald chose not to run; and Scott Walker aide John Hiller and former Dodge County Sheriff Todd Nehls had been discussed as potential candidates, but did not run. Grothman won the primary but Petri has refused to endorse him, going as far as saying that Democratic nominee Mark Harris had done "a fine job" as County Executive. Grothman has declined to participate in debates and has turned down requests for interviews.

Democratic Winnebago County Executive Mark Harris is the Democratic Party nominee.

The general election will also feature Gus Fahrendorf, of Neenah, as the nominee of the Libertarian Party.

Primary results

General election

Results

District 7

The seventh district is represented by Republican Sean Duffy. Ashland businesswoman and City Council member Kelly Westlund is the 2014 Democratic nominee.

Primary results

General election

Results

District 8

The eighth district is represented by Republican Reid Ribble. Ron Gruett (pronounced 'grit'), a professor of physics and chemistry, is the Democratic nominee.

Primary results

General election

Results

See also
 2014 United States House of Representatives elections
 2014 United States elections

References

External links
U.S. House elections in Wisconsin, 2014 at Ballotpedia
Campaign contributions at OpenSecrets

Wisconsin
2014
United States House of Representatives